Levy Tran (born November 16, 1983), born as Vy Le Tran, is an American actress and model, best known for her role as Roenick in the 2018 film The First Purge, Desi Nguyen in MacGyver, the guest hostess to MTV's Guy Code, for her appearance as the race starter in the 2015 film Furious 7, and as a tattooed model.

Early life
Levy was born November 16, 1983 in San Jose, California to Vietnamese parents.  She can speak English and Vietnamese. After she graduated from high school, she received a bachelor's degree in child and adolescent development while minoring in mathematics. Afterwards, she worked at a funeral home as an embalmer in 2011.

Career
In 2011, Tran pursued a modeling career, and after doing commercials decided to move to Los Angeles in 2012.  Tran then became successful in modeling as a top Asian female model. Tran modeled for top brands like Inked Magazine, Glass Magazine and Tattoo Life. She stated that her favorite tattoo on her body is her zombie tattoo because of its artistry, but partially regrets her first tattoo she got when she was 18 years old.  In 2012, Levy made her first television debut on MTV's Guy Code as a guest host. In 2013, Tran was involved in a controversial music video called "Asian Girlz" created by Day Above Ground. Tran quickly apologized for the music video stating: “I sincerely apologize to all who feels that I set Asian women back 50 yrs. I know I lost respect from a lot of ppl [sic]. It wasn't my intention. [...] It was meant to be light hearted and fun. Satirical. They are sweet boys and not at all racist. That is all I will say. I'm sorry once again.”

In 2015, Levy played the role of the race starter in Furious 7. She was later voted as one of the most beautiful women of the Fast & Furious franchise. She later went on to have appearances on the television series Jungle Justice in 2015, and later starred in the films Female Fight Squad and The Unwilling.  Tran went on to appear in several other television series, including playing Eddie in season 8 of Shameless. Levy then went on to play the role of Roenick in the 2018 film The First Purge, and also appeared in the 2018 Netflix series The Haunting of Hill House, as Trish Park.

Levy was cast to play operative Desiree "Desi" Nguyen in the final eight episodes for season three of MacGyver in 2019. Tran said that she enjoys her role as Desi, and was excited for season four. In June 2019, Tran was officially confirmed as a main cast member for season four of MacGyver.

Personal life
Tran is very dedicated to her fitness. Tran has also stated "I want to start a movement of new age housewives where you have women with dyed hair, piercings, and tattoos who are very traditional in a household kind of setting."

Filmography

Film

Television

References

External links
 

Living people
1983 births
21st-century American actresses
American models of Vietnamese descent
American film actresses
American female models
Female models from California
People from San Jose, California